Newmarket GAA is a Gaelic football and Hurling club in Newmarket, County Cork, Ireland which is part of the parish of Newmarket, Taur. Newmarkets football team competes in the Cork Senior A Football Championship and their hurling team competes in the Duhallow Junior A Hurling Championship.

History

The Gaelic Athletic Association has been part of life in Newmarket since the closing years of the 19th century. The records show that the club fielded teams in the Cork Senior Football Championship of 1897 and 1901. The club's story begins really in 1927, when the junior footballers reached the Cork Junior Football Championship final against Urhan. The game was played in Killarney in March 1928. Captained by Paddy O'Shea, they lost out to Urhan. That same year they played in the Cork Senior Football Championship, losing to eventual winners Collins Barracks. The Duhallow division was founded in 1932 with the club enjoying considerable success in the Duhallow Junior A Hurling Championship, winning it on 15 occasions and leading the roll of honour up to the 1980s. Newmarket returned to the Cork Junior Football Championship final in 1950, captained by Jimmy O'Keeffe. They lost out to Canovee in a replay. 
Twice the County Junior Football title has come to the club, in 1970 and 1998. And in 2011, the club gained Senior status by winning the Premier Intermediate County Championship for the first time. While in 1981 the County under 12 football title was won under the management of Vincent O'Connor. The minor football team collected the County Minor A Football League title in 2005 having earlier been the runners up in the Championship final.
In 2010 The Newmarket Minor Hurling team won the 12 aside C Hurling County Championship, becoming the first team ever to bring a County hurling title to town. 2011 was a great year for Newmarket GAA with the Premier Intermediate Footballers winning the County Final. Newmarket played Senior Football in 2012 and 2013. In 2019 Newmarket won their first Duhallow Junior A Hurling Championship in 40 years beating Kilbrin on a scoreline of 1-22 to 2-11.

Noted players
 Danny Culloty
 Jerry Cronin
 Mark O'Sullivan

Honours
Cork Premier Intermediate Football Championships (2): 2011, 2021
Cork Intermediate Football Leagues (1): 2000
 Cork Junior Football Championships (2): 1970, 1998
Duhallow Junior A Football Championships (8): 1949, 1950, 1965, 1968, 1969, 1970, 1993, 1998
Duhallow Junior A Hurling Championships (15): 1934, 1935, 1936, 1937, 1942, 1946, 1947, 1948, 1950, 1964, 1974, 1975, 1976, 1979, 2019
Cork Junior A Hurling Championship (0)  Semi-Finalists: 2018, 2019

See also
 Newmarket, County Cork
 Duhallow GAA

References

External links
 Newmarket GAA Official Website

Gaelic games clubs in County Cork
Gaelic football clubs in County Cork
Hurling clubs in County Cork